Mukerian is a city and municipal council of Hoshiarpur district in Punjab, India.
line and is connected by road with Jalandhar, Hoshiarpur, Talwara, Gurdaspur and Pathankot. National Highway-44 also passes through here.

Geography

Demographics
The Mukerian Municipal Council has population of 129,841 In Mukerian Municipal Council, Female Sex Ratio is of 921 against state average of 895. Moreover Child Sex Ratio in Mukerian is around 802 compared to Punjab state average of 846. Literacy rate of Mukerian city is 88.07 % higher than state average of 75.84 %. In Mukerian, Male literacy is around 90.31 % while female literacy rate is 85.68 %.

History
The Mukerian city is a marks the easternmost border of Alexander the Great's conquests in 326 BCE at banks of bias river. It was one of the area  which created problems in Alexander's invasion of India. His troops mutinied here in 326 BCE, refusing to go any further; {from refusing by army troops of Alexander’s force the name of the city mukria (refuse) to Mukerian}
they had been away from home for eight years. Alexander shut himself in his tent for three days, but when his men did not change their desires he gave in, raising twelve colossal altars to mark the limit and glory of his expedition.

And other history about the name of city is the Local tradition goes that Chaudhry Dara Khan of Awan Caste in 1216 A. D founded Mukerian. 
Another tradition relates that the city was named after one Mukeria Kalal and with the passage of time it was corrupted to Mukerian.Its also mention that Jarral Rajputs Defeat Awans in 17th Century & Built 14 Villages.Raja Veer Singhs Samadhi Also Known As Baba Shaheed in Jandwal,Mukerian.

The city was enlarged and improved about 1768 by Sardar Jai Singh Kanhaya, who held possession of it. His daughter-in-law was Mai Sada Kaur whose daughter, Mehtab Kaur was married to maharaja Ranjit Singh. This union gave Ranjit Singh the co-operation of the Kanhaya enabled him to consolidate his power. Maharaja Ranjit Singh is said to have acquired the neighbouring fort of Atalgarh in 1819, now in ruins. A gurdwara has been erected on the ruins of the fort. In between the gurdwara and railway line, there is a baradari, which is in dilapidated condition. Maharani Mehtab Kaur gave birth to Ranjit Singh's son, Sher Singh here, who afterwards became Maharaja.

Education

Education Institutions in Mukerian Area:
Anglo-Sanskrit Senior Secondary School, Mukerian
Sri Guru Gobind Singh Public School, Beghpur Kamlooh
Dashmesh Public School, Chak ala Baksh
Victoria International School, Mukerian
Army Public School, Unchi Bassi
Springdales Public School
Woodbury World School,.Piru chak
C.D Gurukul International school
Cambridge Overseas School, Mukerian

ICSE affiliated schools
The Sovereign School, Mansar (ICSE, ISC)
St. Augustine School, Pandori (ICSE, ISC)
St. Joseph's Convent School, Mukerian (ICSE)

Degree colleges
Dashmesh Girls' College, Chak ala baksh
S.P.N. College, Mukerian

Engineering college
S.B.C.M.S. Institute Of Technology

Polytechnic college
Brahm Kamal Polytechnic College

Points of interest

Mukerian Hydel Project is one of the biggest irrigation projects in India.

There is a natural shivling in the temple. 

A Gurudwara Sahib is located in the village Manjpur, about 10 kilometers away from Mukerian city.
Budhabarh is the 2nd largest town in the Mukerian area

Medical facilities
Civil Hospital 
Swami Premanand Charitable Hospital
Dr.Kamaljit Neuro-Psychiatry Hospital, De-addiction and MRI Centre.
Jhanjee hospital
Pranav Multispeciality Hospital
Dogra Hospital Multispeciality and Trauma Care Center
Sanjeevani Hospital
Narendera's Hospital
Lifecare Hospital
Dawinder Hospital & Heart Care
SAINI EYE HOSPITAL
Gautam Eye Hospital
Apex Hospital
Chaudhary gynae hospital
SS MEDICITY TALWARA ROAD

References

Cities and towns in Hoshiarpur district